Demobbed is a cult Russian comedy film by Roman Kachanov, offering an absurdist view on the Russian army by the eyes of a conscript. The brutal rituals of Dedovshchina, a major problem within Russian society, is shown not as a tragedy, but as an idyllically insane process of resocialization.

Several stars of the Soviet cinema cast in the roles of senior officers; prominent theater director Sergey Artsybashev portrayed the iconic protagonist Dikiy Prapor ("Wild Warrant Officer") 

The film's popularity encouraged the producers to create four sequels (DMB-2, DMB-3, DMB-4 and DMB-5), but with limited reception.

Plot 

Three young Russians from very different walks of life involuntarily enter the military to escape their past.

Awards

International awards
 2000 — Demobbed — FIPRESCI Special Mention: «For its humour and for the ironic look on Russian society which allows to overcome tragedies of everyday life and might open doors to the new cinema.

Selected national awards
 2000 – Russian Guild of Film Critics  Best Screenplay (Roman Kachanov, Ivan Okhlobystin).
 2000 — Kinotavr Special Jury Prize

References

External links

 FIPRESCI-Awards-2000

2000 films
Russian comedy films
2000s Russian-language films
Films set in Russia
Military of Russia in films
Military humor in film
Films about military personnel
2000 comedy films
Films directed by Roman Kachanov